Olwen Williams OBE is a Consultant Physician in Genitourinary/HIV Medicine based at Betsi Cadwaladr University Health Board, North Wales. She was appointed an OBE for services to medicine in Wales in 2005. and Welsh Woman of the Year in 2000.

Early life and education 
Brought up in North Wales and a Welsh speaker, she was educated at Ysgol Dyffryn Nantlle and the University of Liverpool.

Career 
Olwen Williams is currently the RCP Vice President for Wales member of the Royal College of Physicians' And RCP Committee for Health Inequalities > She also has held the positions of Vice-President of the Medical Women's Federation (2016-2018), Divisional Vice-President for the NSPCC in Wales, Trustee of the National AIDS Trust, Honorary Fellow and Lay Member of Council of Bangor University
She was the clinical lead for the Royal College of Physicians' Future Hospitals project development site at Betsi Cadwaladr University Health Board, a project using telemedicine to improve access to clinical services for the elderly and frail in rural Wales through the virtual clinic C@rtref. She has also acted as an advisor to the Welsh Government and was elected a Fellow of the Learned Society of Wales in 2017 She served at board level and previously been president of the British Association for Sexual Health and HIV (BASHH)2018-20. 
 OBE for services to medicine in Wales, 2005
 Welsh Woman of the Year, 2000
.

References 

Year of birth missing (living people)
Living people
Members of the Order of the British Empire
Members of the Royal College of Physicians
Alumni of the University of Liverpool
20th-century Welsh medical doctors
21st-century Welsh medical doctors
Welsh women medical doctors